Gargamella blokoverdensis is a species of sea slug, a dorid nudibranch, shell-less marine opisthobranch gastropod mollusks in the family Discodorididae.

Distribution
This species was described from the Parda reef, Sal island, Cape Verde. The specimens were found in the intertidal zone or up to 1 m depth.

Description
Gargamella blokoverdensis is a small dorid nudibranch, growing to 16 mm in length. It is orange in colour with spots of brown.

References

Discodorididae
Gastropods of Cape Verde
Fauna of Sal, Cape Verde
Gastropods described in 2015